Nefundella distractor is a species of snout moth in the genus Nefundella. It is found in Puerto Rico.

References

Moths described in 1956
Phycitini